Deception  is a 1932 American Pre-Code sports drama centering on crooked fight promoter Jim Hurley (Leo Carrillo) and naive former football player Bucky O'Neill (Nat Pendleton) whom he dupes into becoming an untrained wrestler in fixed bouts. When Hurley's girlfriend Lola Del Mont (Thelma Todd) becomes romantically attracted to O'Neill, Hurley fixes his next match for wrestler Ivan Stanislaus (Hans Steinke) to win. O'Neill plots his revenge during the next year as he secretly goes through rigorous wrestling training in another location. He returns disguised in a costume stolen from another wrestler, and Hurley orders him killed when he discovers his identity.

Cast
Leo Carrillo – Jim Hurley 
Nat Pendleton – Bucky O'Neill 
Thelma Todd – Lola Del Mont
Barbara Weeks – Joan Allen
Hans Steinke – Ivan Stanislaus 
Frank Sheridan – Leo
Henry Armetta – Nick
Dickie Moore – Dickie Allen

References

External links
 
 
 
 

1932 films
1930s sports drama films
American black-and-white films
Columbia Pictures films
American boxing films
American sports drama films
Films directed by Lewis Seiler
1932 drama films
1930s English-language films
1930s American films